The 30 municipalities of the region of North Ostrobothnia in Finland are divided on seven sub-regions.



Koillismaa sub-region 
Kuusamo
Taivalkoski

Nivala–Haapajärvi sub-region 
Haapajärvi
Kärsämäki
Nivala
Pyhäjärvi
Reisjärvi

Oulu sub-region 
Hailuoto (Karlö)
Kempele
Liminka (Limingo)
Lumijoki
Muhos
Oulu (Uleåborg)
Tyrnävä

Oulunkaari sub-region 
Ii (Ijo)
Pudasjärvi
Utajärvi
Vaala

Raahe sub-region 
Pyhäjoki
Raahe (Brahestad)
Siikajoki

Siikalatva sub-region 
Haapavesi
Pyhäntä
Siikalatva

Ylivieska sub-region 
Alavieska
Kalajoki
Merijärvi
Oulainen
Sievi
Ylivieska

See also 
Oulu Province
Regions of Oulu

External links